The Thirty-Nine Steps is an adventure novel by Scottish author John Buchan. It was serialized in All-Story Weekly (5 – 12 June 1915) and Blackwood's Magazine (credited to "H de V.", July – September 1915) before being published in book form in October 1915 by William Blackwood and Sons, Edinburgh. It is the first of the five novels featuring Richard Hannay, an all-action hero with a stiff upper lip and a miraculous knack for getting himself out of tricky situations.

The novel has been adapted many times, including several films and a long-running stage play. In 2003, the book was listed on the BBC's The Big Read poll of the UK's "best-loved novels."

Background

John Buchan wrote The Thirty-Nine Steps while he was ill in bed with a duodenal ulcer, an illness which remained with him all his life. Buchan's son William later wrote that the name of the book originated when the author's daughter was counting the stairs at St Cuby, a private nursing home on Cliff Promenade in Broadstairs, where Buchan was convalescing. "There was a wooden staircase leading down to the beach. My sister, who was about six, and who had just learnt to count properly, went down them and gleefully announced: there are 39 steps." There were actually 78, but he halved the number to make a better title. When the original steps were later replaced, one of them, complete with a brass plaque,  was sent to Buchan. They were replaced by concrete, and this set, now numbering 108, still runs from the garden to the beach.

The novel was his first "shocker", as he called it—a story combining personal and political dramas. It marked a turning point in Buchan's literary career and introduced his adventuring hero Richard Hannay. He described a "shocker" as an adventure where the events in the story are unlikely and the reader is only just able to believe that they really happened.

Plot summary
In late May 1914, when World War I is imminent in Europe, Richard Hannay returns home to London after having lived and worked in Rhodesia as a mining engineer. One night, his neighbour, an American who claims to be in fear for his life, asks if Hannay can let him in. The man appears to know of an anarchist plot to destabilise Europe, beginning with a plan to assassinate the Greek Premier, Constantine Karolides, during his forthcoming visit to London on the forthcoming 15 June. 

The man, named Franklin P. Scudder, is a freelance spy, and reveals that he has faked his own death with a corpse in his flat. Scudder claims to be following a ring of German spies called the Black Stone who are trying to steal Britain's naval defense plans for the outbreak of war and are also after him. Hannay, convinced of his honesty, lets Scudder hide in his flat. Police discover the fake suicide, but suspect nothing. Nonetheless, Hannay finds Scudder murdered in his flat a few days later. Feeling now bestowed with the responsibility to foil the plot, as well as in mortal danger himself, Hannay takes up Scudder's encoded little notebook and escapes his apartment under watch by the plotters by disguising himself as the milkman the next early morning.

Arriving just in time at St. Pancras Station, Hannay takes a train to Galloway, in south-west Scotland, believing it sufficiently remote to hide in until just before the fateful date in June. Hannay lodges in a shepherd's cottage overnight and reads in a newspaper that the police are looking for him in Scotland, suspecting him of Scudder's murder. Hannay boards a local train heading east, but jumps off between stations to confuse his trail. He eventually finds an inn where he stays the night. He tells the innkeeper a modified version of his story, and persuades the man to shelter him. While staying at the inn, Hannay cracks the cipher used in Scudder's codebook. The next day, two men arrive at the inn looking for Hannay, but the innkeeper sends them away. When they return later, Hannay recognizes them as his watchers in London, stealthily leaves the inn, steals their car and drives off.

But soon, Hannay sees that he is being pursued by an aeroplane. Later, a policeman in a remote village tries to stop him as he drives through, making him realize that a search warrant for him has been issued. He decides to stay off the main roads, driving very fast he nearly gets into a crash with another motorcar. Swerving to avoid it, his car falls off a cliff, Hannay narrowly escaping death. The other driver, Harry Bullivant, a local landowner and prospective politician, feels dreadfully responsible for this and offers to take him home to clean up. When he learns that Hannay possesses deep knowledge of Australia, he excitedly invites him to address an election meeting that afternoon where is due to speak about the Colonies, but is ridden with stage fright. Hannay manages well, better than Harry. Both return to Harry's place and Hannay feels able to entrust him with his story. To thank him for his speech and help him with the plot, Harry writes an introductory letter about Hannay to his godfather who holds a senior position at the Foreign Office.

Hannay leaves Harry by foot and tries to hide in the countryside, but is spotted again by the aeroplane. He then notices a group of men on the ground searching for him. Miraculously, he meets a road mender out on the moor, who is suffering from a severe hangover and is afraid that the new road surveyor due this very day sees him in such a state. Hannay offers to swap places with him, sending the grateful workman home for the day. His disguise eventually fools a party of pursuers by car, whom Hannay recognises as those looking for him at the inn. As dawn nears, an acquaintance from London, Marmaduke Jopley, whom Hannay hates drives by. Hannay calls him by his name, forces him to lend him his driver's outfit and takes the wheel for several miles until they have passed the roadblocks that had been set up. He then lets his hostage free, who drives off.

Now back on foot, after an uncomfortable night on the hills, Hannay wakes up in shock when he sees that the search posse is closing in on him again, and he runs off. He finds a cottage and enters, desperate for cover, and the occupant calmly welcomes him. Unfortunately, the man turns out to be Hannay's very enemy, the spy ring's chief. After a brief interrogation where Hannay plays fool, he locks him into a storage room, not sure who the scruffy man in front of him really is, preferring to wait for his accomplices to return, who had seen Hannay the day before. The room in which Hannay is locked appears to contain bomb-making materials, which he uses to break out of the cottage. Badly shaken by the explosion and intoxicated by the fumes, he crawls to the top of a building nearby where he waits until dawn while everyone has gone to look for him, then runs off at night, narrowly escaping a few traps around the property.

Hannay returns to the helpful road mender's place to retrieve his possessions, but is so badly hurt after his escape that he has to stay in bed for a few days to recover from his escape. He then joins a shepherd to walk to the nearest station, where he catches a train to go and meet Harry's Foreign Office relative, Sir Walter Bullivant, who is taking a few days' vacation at his summer retreat in the Kent countryside. After exchanging coded signals, Hannay is invited to join Sir Walter at the house, is given a new attire, bathes luxuriously and is served a beautiful dinner. Sir Walter, who had received Harry's letter, then summons Hannay to spew out his story. They discuss Scudder's notes, Sir Walter believes in it except the Greek Premier's murder plot. He suddenly receives a phone call from London telling him that Karolides has indeed just been assassinated. Sir Walter and Hannay return to London the next morning, where they clear his name at Scotland Yard who release him, free of involvement in Scudder's murder. Sir Walter lets Hannay off for the evening as he has arranged an emergency top-secret meeting at his London home to discuss the situation and Britain's naval defence plan with government members and a French army representative. However, Hannay feels agitated and unfulfilled; after an unpleasant dinner, he goes for a walk and runs into a party with Marmaduke Jopley, who tries to arrest him as Scudder's murderer. Hannay gets into a fight, flees followed by the police and everyone. Sprinting fast he manages to reach Sir Walter's home, where he finds shelter in his hallway while the butler closes the door on his pursuers. While Hannay waits for the meeting to end, the First Sea Lord leaves. Yet, they briefly make eye contact and Hannay is certain that the man is one of his pursuers in disguise. He breaks into the meeting room, rudely interrupting the proceedings, forcing Sir Walter into telephoning the First Sea Lord's home, where a servant informs them his Lordship is asleep in bed and never went to Sir Walter's meeting.

Desperate to stop the imposter from escaping with the secret information that was discussed, Hannay and the officials comb Scudder's notebook. They reason that the phrase "the thirty-nine steps," along with the date and tidal information (high tide at 10:17 PM) must indicate the location of the escape point for the conspirators. They all go to the Admiralty for help, and in the dead of night, manage to summon the help of a coast guardsman, who knows this part of the coast well and identifies a particular, quiet middle-class location on the South-East coast of England that matches Scudder's description. Hannay immediately sets off by car with a police officer to 
this place while Sir Walter makes arrangements with Scotland Yard. They find an area near the shore with several sets of steps, one of them having 39, and an anchored yacht nearby. They approach the boat posing as fishermen and discover that the officer on board looks, and seems very German. Hannay then watches three men playing tennis in the villa with the 39-steps staircase. They match the description of his pursuers, but their extraordinarily normal behaviour causes him to doubt their involvement. Despite his anguish and fear of being utterly mistaken, he confronts the men. They are totally surprised and invite him to join their game of cards. Hannay grows increasingly uncomfortable, yet by chance spots a subtle gesture that he had seen his host make when he was interrogating him at his cottage on the moor. This reassures him that they are his pursuers. Furthermore, one of his hosts suddenly explains that he has to leave. Masks are down. Hannay blows a whistle and his men enter to arrest them, but the man in a hurry escapes, bound for the yacht at sea. Hannay reveals they have already taken the boat, and all three men are arrested. The United Kingdom enters World War I three weeks later, its secret naval defence plans intact, and Hannay is commissioned as a captain in the Army.

Literary significance and criticism
The Thirty-Nine Steps is one of the earliest examples of the '"man-on-the-run" thriller archetype subsequently adopted by film makers as a much-used plot device. In The Thirty-Nine Steps, Buchan holds up Richard Hannay as an example to his readers of an ordinary man who puts his country's interests before his own safety. The story was a great success with the men in the First World War trenches. One soldier wrote to Buchan, "The story is greatly appreciated in the midst of mud and rain and shells, and all that could make trench life depressing."

Hannay continued his adventures in four subsequent books. Two were set during the war, when he continued his undercover work against the Germans and their allies the Turks in Greenmantle (1916) and Mr Standfast (1919). The other two stories, The Three Hostages (1924) and The Island of Sheep (1936) were set in the postwar period, when Hannay's opponents were criminal gangs.

Characters 
 Richard Hannay – colonial recently arrived from Southern Africa, who is the protagonist and narrator
 Franklin P. Scudder – freelance spy
 Karolides – Greek Premier under threat of assassination, who never appears and is only alluded to.
 Sir Harry – Scottish landowner and would-be politician
 Sir Walter Bullivant – Sir Harry's relation at the Foreign Office

Adaptations
The novel has been adapted for multiple media; many of these versions depart significantly from the text—for example, by introducing a love interest absent from the original novel and inspired by Hitchcock's film. In most cases, the title is often abbreviated to The 39 Steps, but the full title is more commonly used for the book and 1978 film adaptation.

Film

The 39 Steps (1935) 

The 1935 black and white film directed by Alfred Hitchcock deviates substantially from the book. It stars Robert Donat as Hannay and Madeleine Carroll as a woman he meets on the train. It is regarded by many critics as the best film version. This was one of several Hitchcock films based upon the idea of an "innocent man on the run", such as Saboteur and North by Northwest. In 1999, it came 4th in a BFI poll of British films and in 2004 Total Film named it the 21st greatest British film of all time.

The 39 Steps (1959) 

The 1959 film directed by Ralph Thomas was the first colour version, starring Kenneth More as Hannay and Taina Elg as Miss Fisher. It is closely based on Hitchcock's adaptation, including the music-hall finale with "Mr. Memory" and Hannay's escape from a train on the Forth Bridge, scenes not present in the book. It features a musical score by Clifton Parker.

The Thirty Nine Steps (1978) 

The 1978 version was directed by Don Sharp and starred Robert Powell as Hannay, Karen Dotrice as Alex, John Mills as Colonel Scudder. It is generally regarded as the closest to the book, being set at the same time as the novel, pre-Great War, but still bears little resemblance to Buchan's original story. Its climax bore no relation to the novel's denouement, instead seeing Hannay hanging from the hands of Big Ben. The film was followed by a spin-off television series, Hannay, also starring Powell and featuring adventures occurring prior to the events in The Thirty-Nine Steps.

The 39 Steps (2008) 

The BBC commissioned a new television adaptation of the novel, scripted by Lizzie Mickery and produced by BBC Scotland's drama unit. The 90-minute film stars Rupert Penry-Jones, Lydia Leonard, Patrick Malahide and Eddie Marsan, and was first broadcast on 28 December 2008 A romantic subplot was added to the story, featuring Lydia Leonard. The storyline only very tenuously follows that of the book, many characters being renamed, or omitted altogether. The film ends with a scene involving a submarine in a Scottish loch, rather than the original setting off the Kent coast, and the apparent death of one character.

Radio
There were numerous American radio adaptations during the two decades following the release of Hitchcock's film, most of which were based on its heavily altered plot. It remains a popular subject for modern live productions done in a similar, old-time radio style.
 1937, starring Robert Montgomery and Ida Lupino, part of the Lux Radio Theater series.
 1938, starring Orson Welles, part of The Mercury Theatre on the Air series.
 1943, starring Herbert Marshall and Madeleine Carroll, part of the Philip Morris Playhouse series.
 1946, starring David Niven, part of The Hour of Mystery series.
 1947, part of the Canadian Broadcasting Company Stage Series.
 1948, starring Glenn Ford and Mercedes McCambridge, part of the Studio One series.
 1952, starring Herbert Marshall, part of the Suspense series.
There have been many full cast adaptations for BBC Radio and all are based directly on Buchan's novel.
 1939, in six parts, adapted by Winifred Carey and produced by James McKechnie.
 1944, in six parts, adapted by Winifred Carey and produced by Derek McCulloch.
 1950, The Adventures of Richard Hannay in 12 half-hour parts, based on The Thirty-Nine Steps and Mr Standfast adapted by Winifred Carey and produced by Donald McLean.
 1950, The Adventures of Richard Hannay in eight half-hour parts, based on The Thirty-Nine Steps and Mr Standfast adapted by Winifred Carey and produced by Donald McLean.
 1960, in six episodes, adapted by J. C. Gosforth and produced by Frederick Bradnum.
 1972, The Adventures of Richard Hannay based on The Thirty-Nine Steps and Mr Standfast in six episodes, adapted by Winifred Carey and produced by Norman Wright.
 1989, dramatised by Peter Buckman and directed by Patrick Rayner.
 2001, starring David Robb, Tom Baker and William Hope, adapted by Bert Coules.
There are also several BBC solo readings:
 1947, in 12 parts, abridged by Hilton Brown and read by Arthur Bush.
 1978, in five parts, abridged by Barry Campbell and read by Frank Duncan.
 1996, in ten parts, produced by Jane Marshall and read by John Nettles.
Other solo readings:
 1994, abridged, read by James Fox and released by Orbis Publishing, as part of their "Talking Classics" series. It consisted of an illustrated magazine accompanied by a double CD or cassette.
 2007, unabridged, read by Robert Powell and released by Audible audiobooks.
 2007, unabridged, read by Peter Joyce and released by Assembled Stories audiobooks.

In 2014, BBC Radio 3 broadcast Landmark: The Thirty-Nine Steps and World War I, a 45-minute documentary on the novel's initial impact at home and abroad.

Theatre

A comic theatrical adaptation by Simon Corble and Nobby Dimon for a cast of four actors premiered in 1995 at the Georgian Theatre Royal in Richmond, North Yorkshire, before embarking on a tour of village halls across the north of England. In 2005, Patrick Barlow rewrote the script, keeping the scenes, staging and small-scale feel, and in June 2005 this re-adaptation premiered at the West Yorkshire Playhouse, The play then opened in London's Tricycle Theatre, and after a successful run transferred to the Criterion Theatre in Piccadilly where it became the fifth longest running play until it closed in September 2015. Although drawing on Buchan's novel, it is strongly influenced by Hitchcock's 1935 film adaptation. On 15 January 2008, the show made its US Broadway premiere at the American Airlines Theatre; it transferred to the Cort Theatre on 29 April 2008 and then moved to the Helen Hayes Theatre on 21 January 2009, where it ended its run on 10 January 2010. It reopened on Stage One of New York's Off-Broadway venue New World Stages on 25 March 2010 and closed on 15 April 2010. The Broadway production received six Tony Award nominations, winning two—Best Lighting Design and Best Sound Design with the London show winning an Olivier in 2007 and two Tony Awards in 2008. The play also won the Drama Desk Award, Unique Theatrical Experience.

Television

Whilst not essentially an adaptation of The 39 Steps, a prequel television series named Hannay, was spawned from the 1978 feature film version. Both the film and the series featured Robert Powell as Hannay.

A planned television adaptation for Netflix as limited series will be produced by Anonymous Content and starring Benedict Cumberbatch was reported in April 2021. The team will include Edward Berger as director and Mark L. Smith as writer.

Video game
A digital adaptation of the novel, created with Unity, was made by Scottish developer The Story Mechanics and released on 25 April 2013, for Windows, OS X, Linux and iPad.

Interactive fiction
In 2008, Penguin Books adapted the story as interactive fiction under the authorship of Charles Cumming calling it The 21 Steps.

References

External links 

 
 
 
 

1915 British novels
British adventure novels
British novels adapted into films
British novels adapted into television shows
British spy novels
Fiction set in 1914
Novels by John Buchan
Novels first published in serial form
Novels set in Dumfries and Galloway
Novels set in London
Scottish thriller novels
William Blackwood books
Works originally published in Blackwood's Magazine